Greenfield Park may refer to:

Greenfield Park, Michigan, an unincorporated community in the United States
Greenfield Park, New South Wales, a suburb of Sydney, Australia
Greenfield Park, New York, a hamlet of the village of Ellensville, New York, United States
Greenfield Park, Quebec, a borough of the city of Longueuil, Quebec and a suburb of Montreal, Canada
Greenfield Park, Wisconsin, a park in Milwaukee county, Wisconsin in the United States
Greenfield Park, a road in Dublin, Ireland
Greenfield Park, a public park in Glasgow, Scotland